Frenchtown is a census-designated place (CDP) in Missoula County, Montana, United States. It is part of the 'Missoula, Montana Metropolitan Statistical Area'. The population was 1,825 at the 2010 census, an increase from its population of 883 in 2000. Frenchtown is also known as an early mixed ancestry settlement in the Pacific Northwest history, sometimes referred as a French Canadian or a Métis settlement.

Nearby is the Frenchtown Pond State Park.

History
Americans gave the location a generic name  based on the ethnicity or language of the original settlers, namely French Canadians.

The settlement was cofounded around 1858 by two French Canadians moving inland with their Metis families to escape turmoil further west that followed the arrival of the American federal authorities. Jean-Baptiste Ducharme left Puget Sound during the Indian Wars (1855-1856) abandoning his land claim as his Muck Creek neighbors were arrested under martial law. Louis Brown (anglicized name) left the Colville Valley turmoil a few years later with his Pend d'Oreille wife and Metis daughters. Meanwhile the Pend d'Oreilles Kalispel had moved upriver to a new locale accompanied by Jesuit priest Father Hoecken who relocated the Saint-Ignatius mission northeast of the future Frenchtown. Louis Brown Metis daughters and grandchildren married into the wave of French Canadian settlers that swept over the valley in the course of the last four decades of the 19th century. Ducharme four Metis sons and two daughters moved North to the Flathead Indian Reservation marrying into the Pend d'Oreille tribe.

The St. Louis Catholic Church was built in 1864.

A post office called Frenchtown was first established in 1868.

Geography
Frenchtown is located at  (47.018780, -114.246205), on the historic Mullan Road.

Demographics

As of the census of 2010, there were 1,825 people, 291 households, and 235 families residing in the CDP. The population density was 271.8 people per square mile (104.9/km2). There were 302 housing units at an average density of 92.9 per square mile (35.9/km2). The racial makeup of the CDP was 96.15% White, 1.59% Native American, 0.11% Asian, 0.79% from other races, and 1.36% from two or more races. Hispanic or Latino of any race were 1.81% of the population.

There were 291 households, out of which 47.4% had children under the age of 18 living with them, 67.0% were married couples living together, 7.9% had a female householder with no husband present, and 19.2% were non-families. 12.7% of all households were made up of individuals, and 4.1% had someone living alone who was 65 years of age or older. The average household size was 3.03 and the average family size was 3.32.

In the CDP, the population was spread out, with 34.3% under the age of 18, 6.5% from 18 to 24, 31.3% from 25 to 44, 22.7% from 45 to 64, and 5.3% who were 65 years of age or older. The median age was 34 years. For every 100 females, there were 106.3 males. For every 100 females age 18 and over, there were 101.4 males.

The median income for a household in the CDP was $46,094, and the median income for a family was $45,938. Males had a median income of $36,118 versus $23,750 for females. The per capita income for the CDP was $21,225. None of the population or families were below the poverty line.

Education 
Frenchtown Public Schools serves grades K-12. Frenchtown High School's team name is the Broncs.

The Missoula Public Library has a branch location in Frenchtown.

Smurfit-Stone mill 

In September 2015, the EPA announced that it was close to an agreement for testing and environmental remediation of Frenchtown's Smurfit-Stone Container Corp. mill site. Contaminants on the site include dioxins and heavy metals, which has raised concerns that the site might be eligible for the federal Superfund list. The paper mill, which produced containerboard, "began production in 1957 under Waldorf Paper Products Co. of St. Paul, MN." The mill employed 417 workers at the time of its closure in 2010. A meeting was held in February 2017 to create a Community Advisory Group to work with the Superfund grantmaking process. Cleanup of PCBs at the mill site was ongoing as of April 2017. As the second largest taxpayer in Missoula county, the mill was the source of nearly 20% ($134281) of the Frenchtown fire district's budget, and 21.7% ($825,976) of the Frenchtown school district's budget.

Popular Culture
James Holden, protagonist in The Expanse (novel series) and TV show, grew up near Frenchtown in the story.

References

External links
 Frenchtown Historical Society Oral History Project (University of Montana Archives)

Census-designated places in Missoula County, Montana
Census-designated places in Montana